Léon Gaucherel (21 May 1816 – 7 January 1886) was a French painter and etcher.

Born at Paris, Gaucherel became a pupil of Eugène Viollet-le-Duc. His first engravings were to illustrate archeological publications, and next he began to produce etchings of old master and contemporary paintings.

After establishing his reputation, Gaucherel took pupils in Paris, and among those he taught were Victor Gustave Lhuillier, Louis Monzies, Edmond Ramus, and Adolphe Lalauze. His work on the Gazette des Beaux-Arts with his fellow printmaker Léopold Flameng helped to lift the publication's reputation.
In his Etchings by French and English Artists (1874) Philip Gilbert Hamerton included work by Gaucherel and Alphonse Legros.

Gallery

Notes

External links

Léon Gaucherel 1816–1886 at Harvard Art Museums

1816 births
1886 deaths
19th-century French engravers
19th-century French male artists
19th-century French painters
People from Paris